John Painter may refer to:

John Painter (supercentenarian) (1888–2001), world's oldest man between November 1999 and March 2001
John Mark Painter (born 1967), American musician
John Painter (cellist) (born 1932), Australian musician
John Painter (theologian) (born 1935), Australian scholar
John Painter (cricketer) (1856–1900), English cricketer
John Hunt Painter (1819–1891), Quaker farmer who sent John Brown the firearms used in the raid on Harpers Ferry

See also

John Paynter (disambiguation)
John Payntor (died 1540), English MP
John the Painter (1752–1777), executed for the crime of arson in royal dockyards